Beth Shalom Synagogue is the principal synagogue of Athens, Greece.  It was built in 1935 of white Pentelic marble, the architecture is an austere Greek Revival style; the building was renovated in 1975. The synagogue is managed by Rabbi Gabriel Negrin, who was elected by the council of Athens’ Jewish community following the death of the long time leader Jacob Arar in 2014.

See also
Etz Chaim Synagogue (Athens)
Ancient Synagogue in the Agora of Athens
History of the Jews in Greece

further reading

References

External link

Sephardi Jewish culture in Greece
Sephardi synagogues
Greek Revival synagogues
Synagogues in Athens
Synagogues completed in 1935
Orthodox synagogues